Rebalance may refer to:

 Rebalancing investments
 Self-balancing binary search tree